The Somasteroidea, or Stomasteroidea, is an extinct order of asterozoan echinoderms first defined in 1951 by W. K. Spencer. Their first appearance in the fossil record was in the Early Ordovician (Tremadocian) and they had become extinct by the Late Devonian (Famennian). They are similar to the asteroids in that their bodies are flattened dorsoventrally and they have five petaloid arms with broad bases. The ambulacral plates in somasteroids are simple and unspecialized, and the arms were thought to be not flexible and were unable to assist in feeding, but the oral mouth parts were more complex. According to the World Register of Marine Species, Stelleroidea is no longer considered valid and it has since been absorbed into Somasteroidea and Asterozoa.

References 

Asterozoa
Fossil taxa described in 1951